Ice District is a $2.5 billion mixed-use sports and entertainment district being developed on  of land in Downtown Edmonton and a portion of the neighbourhood of Central McDougall. Its main attraction is Rogers Place, the home arena of the Edmonton Oilers professional ice hockey team. When completed the area will be Canada's largest mixed-use and entertainment district. The developers of the district are the Katz Group and the ONE Development Group. On July 13, 2015, it was announced that the area of the city surrounding the arena from 101 and 104 Street to 103 and 106 Avenue would be referred to as "Ice District" – a name created by Daryl Katz.

Landmarks and attractions

Rogers Place

Rogers Place, the home arena for the Edmonton Oilers of the National Hockey League, is the main attraction of the district. Opened on September 8, 2016, it seats 18,500 people for hockey games. The cost of the arena was around $480 million.

Ford Hall
It is a public gathering space and connects the Edmonton LRT with the grand entrance of Rogers Place. There will also be a pedway connection to the new JW Marriott hotel. It opened on September 8, 2016, at a cost of $56.5 million.

Public plaza
There is a  public plaza first opened to the public for the 2022 Stanley Cup playoffs and is nicknamed the "Moss Pit" by fans after the late Joey Moss.

Community arena
The Edmonton Downtown Community Arena is the home arena of the MacEwan University Griffins hockey teams, and hosts practices for the Oilers and the Edmonton Oil Kings of the Western Hockey League. It has a seating capacity of 1000.

Grand Villa Casino Edmonton

The Grand Villa Casino Edmonton is a casino in Edmonton, Alberta, Canada, that opened on September 7, 2016, and is owned by Gateway Casinos. It is located next to Rogers Place in the Ice District in Downtown Edmonton. The  facility cost $32 million. It replaced the adjacent Baccarat Casino, which operated from 1996 to 2016 and which was demolished later in 2020.

The  gaming space includes 600 slot machines and 28 table games. The casino has three restaurants.

In 2019, Gateway Casinos laid off staff and announced the casino would only be open 4 days a week.  The casino suspended operations in March 2020 due to the COVID-19 pandemic, and did not reopen until July 2022.

Public transportation

Pedways
The Edmonton Pedway is being expanded with additions to Edmonton Tower, Stantec Tower, JW Marriott Edmonton, and Rogers Place, linking them to the existing system by elevated and underground pedways.

Parking facilities
With the new development about 4,000 new parking spaces are being created. As well there will be 5,000–10,000 within a 5-to-10-minute walk from the arena and public plaza. Major roads include 104 Avenue, 101 Street, and 105 Street.

Transit
The district's main public transportation is handled through the Edmonton Transit Service bus routes (ETS) and Edmonton Light Rail Transit (LRT). The main LRT station is MacEwan station, located just north of Rogers Place. With the pedway system additions, four LRT stations will have direct access; this includes MacEwan, Bay/Enterprise, Central, and Churchill stations. A number of Strathcona County Transit and St. Albert Transit bus routes also serve the district.

Office and residential towers

Three new office buildings were/are being constructed in the district, as well as a hotel with private residences above. The City of Edmonton Tower with 29 floors and a height of  opened in December 2016, with construction coming to an end in 2017.

Stantec Tower

Thirty-three stories will be dedicated towards residential units.

Edmonton Tower

It was topped-out in early spring 2016, and completed in December 2016. City of Edmonton staff began moving to the tower in November 2016. It is Edmonton's eighth tallest building.

JW Marriott Edmonton & Residences

The JW Marriott Edmonton Ice District & Residences was completed in August 2019. The 356-room hotel component, occupying the 1st through 22nd floors, is operated by JW Marriott Hotels. It has  for conference halls and a  ballroom. This is the third hotel of this brand in Canada. Residential condominiums known as the Legends Private Residences occupies the 23rd through 54th floors above the hotel.

CWB National Headquarters
CWB is an under construction office tower in the Ice District. It will sit at 104 Avenue and 103 Street and be 16 storeys tall. In March 2019, it was announced that a Loblaws CityMarket would serve as the anchor tenant for the retail podium, with construction slated to begin "immediately." The retail podium is expected to completed in early 2022., and the tower portion of the project is expected to be complete in 2025.

See also
Downtown Edmonton
Edmonton Oilers
Old Strathcona
List of tallest buildings in Edmonton
Northlands Coliseum

References

External links

 
Culture of Edmonton
Ice hockey in Edmonton
Tourist attractions in Edmonton
Entertainment districts in Canada
Katz Group
2015 establishments in Alberta